Neuroxena medioflavus is a moth of the  subfamily Arctiinae. It is found in Ghana and Nigeria.

References

 Natural History Museum Lepidoptera generic names catalog

Nyctemerina